Repete may refer to:
 Re-Pete, a former mascot of the Pittsburgh Penguins hockey team
 Pete Francis Heimbold (born 1975), American musician
 Pete Dzoghi, American comedian
 Repete (film), short film by Czech animator Michaela Pavlátová

See also 
 Repeat (disambiguation)